West Dunbartonshire is one of the 32 local government council areas of Scotland. The area lies to the north-west of the City of Glasgow and contains many of Glasgow's commuter towns and villages. West Dunbartonshire also borders Argyll and Bute, East Dunbartonshire, Renfrewshire and Stirling.

The council area was formed in 1996 from the former Clydebank district and the eastern part of Dumbarton district, which had both been part of Strathclyde Region.

West Dunbartonshire has three main urban areas: Clydebank, Dumbarton and the Vale of Leven. The area also includes the intervening rural areas, including the Kilpatrick Hills and the south-eastern bank of Loch Lomond. The council is based at 16 Church Street in Dumbarton, although Clydebank is the largest town.

History
West Dunbartonshire was created in 1996 under the Local Government etc. (Scotland) Act 1994, which abolished the regions and districts which had been created in 1975, replacing them with unitary council areas. West Dunbartonshire covered the area of the abolished Clydebank district and the eastern part of Dumbarton district. In a referendum in 1994 the largely rural western part of the old Dumbarton district, including the town of Helensburgh, had voted to join Argyll and Bute rather than stay with Dumbarton.

The 1994 act originally named the new district "Dumbarton and Clydebank", but the shadow authority elected in 1995 requested a change of name to "West Dunbartonshire", which was agreed by the government before the new council area came into force.

Communities
The area is divided into 17 community council areas, 10 of which have community councils as at 2023 (being those with asterisks in the list below):

Alexandria*
Balloch and Haldane
Bonhill and Dalmonach*
Bowling and Milton*
Clydebank East*
Dalmuir and Mountblow
Dumbarton East and Central*
Dumbarton North
Dumbarton West
Duntocher and Hardgate
Faifley*
Kilmaronock*
Linnvale and Drumry
Old Kilpatrick*
Parkhall, North Kilbowie and Central*
Renton
Silverton and Overtoun*

Governance

The council comprises 22 councillors elected from 6 wards.

Political control
The first election was held in 1995, initially operating as a shadow authority alongside the outgoing authorities until the new system came into force on 1 April 1996. Political control of West Dunbartonshire Council since 1996 has been as follows:

Leadership
The leaders of the council since 1996 have been:

Premises
The council is based at the former Burgh Hall at 16 Church Street in Dumbarton. It also has an area office  in the main shopping centre in Clydebank.

When the council was created in 1996, it inherited several buildings from its predecessors, including Municipal Buildings and Crosslet House from Dumbarton District Council, Clydebank Town Hall and the nearby Council Offices on Rosebery Place from Clydebank District Council, and the County Buildings, Dumbarton from Strathclyde Regional Council.

The council gradually consolidated its offices, with Crosslet House being demolished in 2015, the Rosebery Place offices being demolished in 2017, and the County Buildings being demolished in 2019.

In 2018 the council consolidated most of its offices to Burgh Hall, which had been vacant for some years. The front part of the 1866 building was retained and a modern office complex built to the rear. The Municipal Buildings in Dumbarton are still used by the council as a register office, whilst Clydebank Town Hall is now primarily an events venue.

Elections
Since 2007 elections have been held every five years under the single transferable vote system, introduced by the Local Governance (Scotland) Act 2004. Election results since 1995 have been as follows:

Since the 2022 election, one Labour councillor was suspended from the party in November 2022, meaning Labour lost its majority on the council which is therefore now under no overall control. One SNP councillor resigned from the party in January 2023. Both now sit as independents.

Wards

Six multi-member wards were created for the 2007 election, replacing 22 single-member wards which had been in place since the creation of the council in 1995:

Lomond (3 seats)
Leven (4 seats)
Dumbarton (4 seats)
Kilpatrick (3 seats)
Clydebank Central (4 seats)
Clydebank Waterfront (4 seats)

Wider politics

Independence referendum
On 18 September 2014, West Dunbartonshire was one of the four council areas which had a majority "Yes" vote in the Scottish Independence Referendum at 54% with an 87.9% turnout rate.

Towns and villages
 Alexandria
 Balloch
 Bonhill
 Bowling
 Clydebank
 Dalmuir
 Drumry
 Dumbarton
 Duntocher
 Faifley
 Gartocharn
 Hardgate
 Jamestown
 Linnvale
 Milton
 Old Kilpatrick
 Renton
 Whitecrook

Main sights
 Erskine Bridge
 Dumbarton Castle
 Inchmurrin, the largest freshwater island in the British Isles
 Kilpatrick Hills
 Loch Lomond
 Loch Lomond and the Trossachs National Park
 Overtoun Bridge
 River Leven

References

External links
 West Dunbartonshire Council

Council areas of Scotland